Craeyvanger is a surname. Notable people with the surname include:

Gerardus Craeyvanger (1775–1855), Dutch violin player and baritone
Gijsbertus Craeyvanger (1810–1895), Dutch painter
Reinier Craeyvanger (1812–1880), Dutch painter and etcher